Switzerland elects on national level a collective head of state, the Federal Council, and a legislature, the Federal Assembly.

Background

The Federal Assembly (Bundesversammlung/Assemblée fédérale/Assemblea federale/Assamblea federala) has two chambers. The National Council (Nationalrat/Conseil national/Consiglio nazionale/Cussegl naziunal) has 200 members, elected for a four-year term by proportional representation  in multi-seat constituencies, the cantons. 

The Council of States (Ständerat/Conseil des Etats/Consiglio degli Stati/Cussegl dals Stadis) has 46 members, elected for four years in 20 two-seat (for full cantons) and 6 single-seat (for half-cantons) constituencies. 

Under the Swiss Federal Constitution, the mode of election to the Council of States is left to the cantons, the provision being that it must be a democratic method. All cantons now provide for the councilors to be chosen by popular election, although historically it was typically the cantons' legislatures that elected representatives to Bern.

In the first round of voting, candidates must obtain an absolute majority of the vote in order to be elected. If no candidate receives an absolute majority in the first round of voting then a second round is held in which a simple plurality is sufficient to be elected. The top two finishing candidates in the second round are elected.

One of the members of the Federal Council assumes the honorific title of President of the Confederation for a one-year term. 

Elections to the National Council conclude on the penultimate Sunday of October. In most cantons, the first round of the election for the Council of States is held alongside the National Council election, while runoff stages are held 3 to 6 weeks later. The new Federal Assembly takes office at the start of the following year.

Switzerland has a multi-party system with numerous parties. A highly unique characteristic of Switzerland is that all executives, from the federal level to even the smallest town at the municipal level, are led by a collective body of individuals (versus a single President or Prime Minister as in other countries). These executives often include members from several political parties.

Federal elections

Latest elections
see 2019 Swiss federal election

See also
 Swiss Federal Council election
 Zauberformel

Notes and references

External links
Adam Carr's Election Archive
Parties and elections
 NSD: European Election Database - Switzerland publishes regional level election data; allows for comparisons of election results, 1991-2007

 

it:Politica della Svizzera